Seth Gilliam (born November 5, 1968) is an American actor. He is best known for his portrayals of Ellis Carver on The Wire, Clayton Hughes on Oz, Detective Daniels on Law & Order: Criminal Intent (2007–2008), Dr. Alan Deaton on Teen Wolf, Father Gabriel Stokes on The Walking Dead, and Sugar Watkins in the movie Starship Troopers.

Early life
Gilliam graduated from State University of New York at Purchase in 1990.

Career
Gilliam's film career began in the early 1990s. He has starred in award-winning films such as Still Alice. His other film credits include Interview with a Vampire in 1994, Sergeant Sugar Watkins in the 1997 action film Starship Troopers and Sergeant Steven Altameyer in the 1996 film Courage Under Fire. 

Gilliam has had a number of recurring roles on television, including during the seventh season of The Cosby Show as Aaron Dexter, boyfriend of Erika Alexander's character, and as Alan Deaton on Teen Wolf. His most prominent role has been on The Wire. In 2008, he attracted attention for criticizing the show being overlooked for Emmy nominations despite its critical success. He has had a number of guest roles in other shows such as CSI: Miami, Nurse Jackie, Skins, Person of Interest, and The Good Wife. He played Clayton Hughes on Oz. In May 2014, Gilliam was cast as Father Gabriel Stokes in the fifth season of AMC's The Walking Dead. Along with Chad Coleman and Lawrence Gilliard Jr., he is the third The Wire alum to join the series.

Gilliam has acted on stage, playing Prince Edward in a 1993 production of Richard III. He played the title role in Othello, first in 2010 at Boston's Commonwealth Shakespeare Company and then the following year at the Houston Shakespeare Festival, directed by his wife, Leah C. Gardiner. The pair returned to Houston in 2013 for Antony and Cleopatra, with Gilliam playing Antony and Gardiner directing. Gilliam has stated that he prefers acting on the stage although he loves his work in film and television: "Acting for the stage is a lot more fun to do. There is instant communication with the audience. An actor can tell whether or not he or she is connecting with an audience or whether they understand what's going on."

Personal life
On May 3, 2015, Gilliam was arrested in Peachtree City, Georgia, for driving under the influence as he was speeding one-hundred and seven miles per hour in a fifty-five miles per hour zone. Police found a marijuana cigarette in his car.

Filmography

Film

Television

Theater

References

External links
 
 
 Bio on The Wire's website (archived)

1968 births
Living people
American male television actors
People from Manhattan
State University of New York at Purchase alumni
20th-century American male actors
21st-century American male actors
American male film actors
African-American male actors
20th-century African-American people
21st-century African-American people